Ash Vale is a village in the borough of Guildford in Surrey, England and the larger, northern settlement of the civil parish of Ash. It is 7 miles (11 km) from Guildford but is closer to the Hampshire towns of Aldershot and Farnborough, the centres of which are each about two miles (4 km) away, immediately across the two crossings of the River Blackwater, to the southwest and northwest.

Geography

Ash Vale's extent is on two sides clearly demarcated, by the river to the west and at a few locks' higher elevation by the parallel Basingstoke Canal to the east – across these boundaries are, respectively, Aldershot Garrison (Military Town) and the large Surrey Heath MoD, mostly UK Army, ranges and training areas. The type of soil of the east, the heath is very acidic, sandy and loamy which makes up just 1.9% of English soil and 0.2% of Welsh soil, which gives rise to pines and coniferous landscapes, such as pioneered at Wentworth and Foxhills estate and is good for biodiversity.

Two branch railway lines cross in the middle of the village without forming a junction.  In the north of the village are Ash Vale railway station and North Camp railway station, on the London-Aldershot-Alton Line and the Reading-Guildford-Gatwick Line respectively. In addition, trains run through Ash Vale from Guildford to Ascot via Aldershot. The village owes its development to the Garrison and to the railways; see the description of the often heath soil under the Ash article, explaining how to the south lies a limited area of fertile farming country.

A Tesco Express store in Lysons Avenue, opposite the railway station, opened on 12 October 2012.

Environment
Air pollution is very low, with no Air Quality Management Areas in this borough or that immediately adjoining, Rushmoor. Drainage is good, the whole draining westward by the gentle valley of the upper Blackwater. In eastern parts distant ordnance fire can be heard from Ash ranges and occasional light aircraft on various tracks over the village take off from Farnborough Airport approximately three miles west.

History
See History of Ash, Surrey.

Economy and amenities
Although Ash Vale was a small semi-military community of the post-war era, the village is now largely a commuter settlement, relying on the half-hourly 40-minute railway connection to Waterloo (there are also local services).

Holly Lodge (Primary) School is next to Carrington Park, which has playground facilities and a route between nearby North Camp Station and Mytchett lake and Basingstoke Canal Visitor Centre on the Basingstoke Canal. The canal's towpath runs through the village.  Within the park are recycling facilities.

Parks and Nature reserves in Ash Vale
Carrington Recreation Ground, off Lysons Avenue
Snaky Lane Local Nature Reserve, off Stratford Road
Avondale Park, Avondale 
Lakeside Park, Lakeside Road
Park off Hawker Road, Old Farm Place Estate
Park off Beaufort Road, Old Farm Place Estate
Park off Old Farm Place, Old Farm Place Estate

South of the village are:
Lakeside Park nature reserve
Willow Park Fishery
Ash Parish Allotments

Youth outreach
The Normandy Youth Centre serves the area by sponsoring community-based programs targeting youth in the area (especially marginal groups and minorities) for the purpose of increasing exposure to educational opportunities and building a stronger community.

Famous residents

Samuel Franklin Cody, the first man to achieve powered heavier-than-air flight in Britain. 
Darren and Martin Bicknell, professional cricketers.
Oliver C.J Williams, Activist.

See also
List of places of worship in Guildford (borough)

Notes and references
notes

references

Further reading

External links

 Ash Parish Council

Villages in Surrey
Borough of Guildford